Gerald Bernard  "Jerry" Greenberg (July 29, 1936 – December 22, 2017) was an American film editor with more than 40 feature film credits. Greenberg received both the Academy Award for Best Film Editing and the BAFTA Award for Best Editing for the film The French Connection (1971). In the 1980s, he edited five films with director Brian De Palma.

Greenberg began his career as an assistant to Dede Allen on the film America America (1963), directed by Elia Kazan. Allen has been called "the most important film editor in the most explosive era of American film". She helped develop the careers of several editors known as "Dede's boys", and Greenberg was the first.

Greenberg was Allen's assistant again on Bonnie and Clyde (1967), which was directed by Arthur Penn. The editing of the ambush scene in this film in which Bonnie and Clyde are killed has been very influential, and Allen credited Greenberg with its actual "cutting". Greenberg was the associate editor for Alice's Restaurant (1969),  again directed by Penn and edited by Allen. By that time Greenberg's independent editing career had commenced with Bye Bye Braverman (1968), which was directed by Sidney Lumet. Greenberg later co-edited Penn's The Missouri Breaks (1976) with Allen and Stephen A. Rotter.

Early career
A native of New York, as a youth, Greenberg learned to edit music and began familiarizing himself with the moviola, splicers, synchronizers and recorders. In 1960, he was offered an apprenticing job for Dede Allen on Elia Kazan’s America America (1963). By 1967, when he and Allen were on Bonnie and Clyde, he was given the task of editing a couple of the shootout scenes, working closely with Allen and director Arthur Penn. He cut his first solo feature, Bye Bye Braverman, for director Sidney Lumet in 1968.

Collaboration with William Friedkin
Greenberg edited two films with director William Friedkin, The Boys in the Band (1970) and The French Connection (1971). The French Connection was a success at the box-office and won the Academy Award for Best Picture. Friedkin attributed much of the film's success to its editing, writing "I can't say too much about the importance of editing. When I looked at the first rough cut of the chase, it was terrible. It didn't play. It was formless, in spite of the fact that I had a very careful shooting plan that I followed in detail. It became a matter of removing a shot here or adding a shot there, or changing the sequence of shots, or dropping one frame, or adding one or two frames. And here's where I had enormous help from Jerry Greenberg, the editor. As I look back on it now, the shooting was easy. The cutting and the mixing were enormously difficult. It was all enormously rewarding."

The car chase sequence in The French Connection has been called "the finest example of montage editing since Battleship Potemkin (1925)"; this early film, directed and edited by Sergei Eisenstein, was seminal in the development of film editing. Greenberg won the Academy Award for Best Film Editing and the BAFTA Award for Best Editing for the film. In 2012, The French Connection was selected as the tenth best edited film of all time in a listing compiled by the Motion Picture Editors Guild.

Apocalypse Now (1979)
Francis Ford Coppola produced, directed, and co-wrote Apocalypse Now, which was released in 1979. Filming had taken over a year in 1976 and 1977. Editing took place over two years prior to its release, and involved several editors; the supervising editor was Richard Marks, another of "Dede's boys". Greenberg described his own role in an interview with Vincent LoBrutto. The film is now remembered as one of the most important to have emerged from American involvement in the long Vietnam War that had ended in 1975. Writing in 1999, critic Roger Ebert said "Apocalypse Now is the best Vietnam film, one of the greatest of all films, because it pushes beyond the others, into the dark places of the soul. It is not about war so much as about how war reveals truths we would be happy never to discover". In the 2012 critics' poll conducted by the British Sight & Sound magazine, Apocalypse Now was rated the fourteenth best film ever made. The editing of Apocalypse Now was rated third best of all films in the 2012 listing of the Motion Picture Editors Guild. With Marks, Walter Murch, and Lisa Fruchtman, Greenberg shared in the film's nominations for the Academy Award, the BAFTA Award, and the ACE Eddie.

Collaboration with Brian De Palma
With the film Dressed to Kill (1980), Greenberg began a 7-year collaboration with director Brian De Palma. Greenberg edited five films with De Palma, with the last being The Untouchables (1987). Greenberg's assistant editor on Dressed to Kill, Bill Pankow, worked on all these films, and was his co-editor for The Untouchables; Pankow subsequently became De Palma's principal editor.

The period of De Palma's collaboration with Greenberg has been described as follows: De Palma's "early lower-budget thrillers, although superbly manufactured, were too bloody and garish for the average taste and infuriated many critics. But De Palma began gaining respectability with Dressed to Kill (1980) and following several critical setbacks, reached the apex in the late 80s with such high-powered productions as The Untouchables (1987) and Casualties of War (1989). A superb technician, he was finally crafting material worthy of his bold, often dazzling, visual flair."

Honors and influence
Greenberg won the Oscar and the BAFTA awards for The French Connection (1971), and was nominated for the ACE Eddie. With his co-editors, he was nominated again for the Oscar, BAFTA, and Eddie for Apocalypse Now (1979). In the same year, he was nominated for the Oscar and BAFTA for Kramer vs. Kramer (1979), which was the first of his two films with director Robert Benton.

Greenberg has been elected to membership in the American Cinema Editors, and in 2015 that organization honored him with its Career Achievement Award. Writing after the ceremony at which Greenberg received the Career Achievement Ward, Ross Lincoln and Erik Pedersen said, "if editing is the most important part of completing a film, he is one of the most quantifiably influential people in the past 40 years." On the 2012 list of "best edited films of all time", Greenberg worked on three of the top ten: Bonnie and Clyde, The French Connection, and Apocalypse Now.

Partial filmography (editor)
This filmography of feature films is based on the listing at the Internet Movie Database. The director of each film is indicated in parenthesis along with the date of each film's release and Greenberg's co-editors.
The Steps (Hirschfield-1966)
Bye Bye Braverman (Lumet-1968)
The Subject Was Roses (Grosbard-1968). Grosbard's directorial debut.
Alice's Restaurant (Penn-1969; associate film editor)
The Boys in the Band (Friedkin-1970). Friedkin's second film as director.
They Might Be Giants (Harvey-1971)
The French Connection (Friedkin-1971)
Come Back, Charleston Blue (Warren-1972; with George Bowers)
The Stoolie (Avildsen/Silano-1972; with Stan Bochner)
Electra Glide in Blue (Guercio-1973; with Jim Benson and John F. Link)
The Seven-Ups (D'Antoni-1973; with Stephen A. Rotter). Rotter was another of Dede Allen's former assistant editors.
The Taking of Pelham One Two Three (Sargent-1974; with Robert Q. Lovett)
The Happy Hooker (Sgarro-1975)
The Missouri Breaks (Penn-1976; with Dede Allen and Stephen Rotter)
Apocalypse Now (Coppola-1979; with Lisa Fruchtman, Richard Marks, and Walter Murch).
Kramer vs. Kramer (Benton-1979).
Dressed to Kill (De Palma-1980). The first of five films that Greenberg edited with De Palma.
Heaven's Gate (Cimino-1980; with Lisa Fruchtman, Tom Rolf, and William Reynolds.
Reds (Beatty-1981; additional editor)
Still of the Night (Benton-1982; with Bill Pankow)
Scarface (De Palma-1983; with David Ray)
Body Double (De Palma-1984; with Bill Pankow).
Savage Dawn (Nuchtern-1985; with George Hively)
Wise Guys (De Palma-1986; Pankow was the associate editor)
No Mercy (Pearce-1986; with Bill Yahraus)
The Untouchables (De Palma-1987; with Bill Pankow). Greenberg's last film with De Palma.
The Accused (Kaplan-1988; with O. Nicholas Brown)
Collision Course (Teague-1989; with Sonya Polonsky)
Christmas Vacation (Chechik-1989; with Michael A. Stevenson)
Awakenings (Marshall-1990; with Battle Davis)
For the Boys (Rydell-1991; with Jere Huggins)
School Ties (Mandel-1992; with Jacqueline Cambas)
Gunshy (Celentano-1998; additional editor)
American History X (Kaye-1998; with Alan Heim)
Reach the Rock (Ryan-1998)
Inspector Gadget (Kellogg-1999; with Alan Cody and Thom Noble) (uncredited)
Duets (Paltrow-2000)
Get Carter (Kay-2000)
Angel Eyes (Mandoki-2001)
Trapped (Mandoki-2002)
Bringing Down the House (Shankman-2003)
Havoc (Kopple-2005; with Nancy Baker)
Invincible (Core-2006)
The Answer Man (Hindman-2009)
Privileged (Salander-2010)
Point Break (Core-2015; with John Duffy and Thom Noble)

References

External links

1936 births
2017 deaths
Best Editing BAFTA Award winners
Best Film Editing Academy Award winners
American film editors
American Cinema Editors
People from New York City